The Kingdom of the Cults, first published in 1965, is a  reference book of the Christian countercult movement in the United States, written by Baptist minister and  counter-cultist Walter Ralston Martin. As of 2019, the book is in its sixth updated edition (hardback ).

Summary
Martin examines a large number of new religious movements; included are major groups such as Christian Science, The Church of Jesus Christ of Latter-day Saints, Jehovah's Witnesses, Armstrongism, Theosophy, the Baháʼí Faith, Unitarian Universalism, Scientology, as well as  minor groups including various New Age and groups based on Eastern religions. The beliefs of other world religions such as Islam and Buddhism are also discussed.

In coverage of the Evangelical-Adventist controversy, the book partially rehabilitated the reputation of Seventh Day Adventist christianity. He covers each group's history and teachings, and contrasts them with those of mainstream Christianity.

In contrast to accepted definition, Martin defines "a cult" as "a group of people gathered about a specific person—or person's misinterpretation of the Bible," while admitting that in spite of "distorting Scripture" such groups' teachings may contain "considerable truths" that have Biblical support but have become de-emphasized by mainstream Christianity, such as divine healing and prophecy.

Influence and reception
By 1989, The Kingdom of the Cults had sold over 500,000 copies and was one of the ten best-selling American spiritual books. The book has been described as being regarded by evangelicals as "the authoritative reference work on major cult systems for nearly 40 years." However, it has been criticized by members of some of the groups it discusses, particularly Mormons, upset that their faith should be labeled a "cult".

There have been several editions over the years with some changes. In the 1985 edition the Nation of Islam was not mentioned, and in the 2003 edition it was put back in a chapter on Islam itself. After Martin's death, a revised and expanded edition was issued that listed Ravi K. Zacharias as co-author.

References

.

1965 non-fiction books
American non-fiction books
Books critical of Mormonism
Christian countercult movement-related books
English-language books